Jim Thornton is an American radio and television announcer, news anchor, and voice actor. He is known for his voiceover work in video games, movies and television shows. Since 2011, he is best known for being the announcer of Wheel of Fortune following the death of longtime announcer Charlie O'Donnell.

Early life and education

Born in Huntington, West Virginia, Thornton graduated from Huntington High School in 1983 and then moved to Los Angeles in 1984 where he started his broadcasting career a year later. He also has a degree in linguistics from Marshall University.

Career

Radio

Thornton is best known as the afternoon anchor on all-news radio KNX 1070 in Los Angeles, having been promoted from traffic reporting. He has also announced on Celebrity Deathmatch and narrated a portion of Monsters, Inc.

Game show announcer
Thornton did substitute announcing work on The Price Is Right following the death of former announcer Rod Roddy. In December 2010, he auditioned for the same role on Wheel of Fortune following the death of the show's announcer Charlie O'Donnell, and was confirmed as the show's new announcer on June 13, 2011. Because of this job, Thornton has scaled back from his job at KNX.

In 2021, Thornton joined Sajak and White as the announcer for Celebrity Wheel of Fortune on ABC.

Voiceover work
Thornton provided the voice of Johnny Gomez in Celebrity Deathmatch and the announcer in The Cleveland Show. He also appeared in video games, where he provided additional voice-over work for Hitman: Blood Money and as a DJ in Mafia II.

Filmography

TV series

Shorts

Movies

Video games

References

External links
More info on Jim Thornton
 

American radio personalities
Game show announcers
Marshall University alumni
Wheel of Fortune (franchise)
Living people
People from Los Angeles
Actors from Huntington, West Virginia
Year of birth missing (living people)
Huntington High School (West Virginia) alumni